James Nelson may refer to:

James Nelson (cricketer) (1873–1950), New Zealand cricketer
James Nelson (sound editor) (1932–2014), American sound editor and film producer
James C. Nelson (born 1944), justice on the Montana Supreme Court
Jamie Nelson (James Victor Nelson, born 1959), American baseball player
James L. Nelson (born 1962), American historical naval novelist
James Nelson (tennis) (born 1982), British professional tennis player

See also
Nelson (surname)
Jim Nelson (disambiguation)
Jimmy Nelson (disambiguation)
Jamie Lindemann Nelson, American philosopher and bioethicist